The Assin (also known as Asin and Asen) are an ethnic group of the Akan people who live in Ghana. The Assin people live predominantly in the Central Region of Ghana. The capital of the Assin district is Assin Foso.

There are two subdivisions of the Assin people. The Assin Apemanim (or Apimenem) live to the east of the Cape Coast-Kumasi Highway, with Manso as their capital city. The Assin Attendansu (or Atandanso) live to the west of the Highway, with Nyankumasi as their capital city.

In 1995, their estimated population was 135,000.

References

Ethnic groups in Ghana